Pavinetant (developmental code names MLE-4901, AZD-4901, AZ-12472520, AZD-2624), is a small-molecule, orally active, selective neurokinin-3 (NK3) receptor antagonist which was under development by AstraZeneca and Millendo Therapeutics for the treatment of hot flashes and polycystic ovary syndrome (PCOS). It was also under investigation for the treatment of schizophrenia, but development was discontinued for this indication due to lack of effectiveness. In November 2017, development of the medication for hot flashes and PCOS was also terminated after its developer assessed the clinical risks and benefits.

See also
 Tachykinin receptor 3 § Agonists

References

External links
 Pavinetant - AdisInsight

 
Abandoned drugs
Carboxamides
NK3 receptor antagonists
Quinolines
Sulfonamides